Oliva baileyi is a species of sea snail, a marine gastropod mollusk in the family Olividae, the olives.

Description
Original description: "Highly polished, thickened, oblong, cylindrical; spire short, flattened, calloused, with incised suture; callus of last whorl produced at posterior end of aperture; aperture narrow, straight; columella with 12-16 low teeth; posterior end of columella without teeth; color bright yellow-tan crossed diagonally by widely separated brown bands that extend from shoulder to anterior tip; diagonal brown bands never coalescing; spire callus bright purple, contrasting greatly with yellow shell; columella and teeth white; interior of aperture lavender."

Distribution
Locus typicus: "Russell Island, Solomon Islands."

References

baileyi
Gastropods described in 1979